Preanger Regencies Residency, sometimes referred to as Preanger Residency and renamed Priangan Residency after 1931, was an administrative division (residency) of the Dutch East Indies located in Parahyangan, West Java which existed from 1817 to 1925. Its capital was in Cianjur until 1856 and thereafter in Bandung. The residency contained the municipality of Bandung and the regencies of Bandoeng, Soemedang, Tasikmalaja, Tjiamis and Garoet.

History

Prehistory
In the sixteenth and seventeenth centuries, the area of Preanger (Parahyangan) had belonged to the Mataram Sultanate. In the late seventeenth century, the Dutch East India Company allied itself with Mataram, but demanded territorial and trade concessions. During this time, the Dutch started to exert more and more influence in the Western part of Java. Mataram finally ceded all control of Cheribon and regions to the south, including the Preanger region, in 1705. That situation remained until 1808, when Napoleonic governor Herman Willem Daendels reorganized the territory in a prefecture (the Batavian and Priangan Regencies) and connected it to Batavia via the Great Post Road.

Residency
In 1818, after the short French and British interregnum in the Dutch East Indies, the territory was reestablished by the Dutch as the Preanger Regencies Residency.

The residency as established in 1818 consisted of three major divisions:
 Cianjur and Sukabumi, ruled directly by the resident whose seat was at Cianjur;
 Bandung;
 Sumedang, Sukapura and Limbangan.

The capital of the residency was transferred from Cianjur to Bandung in 1856, but the seat of the resident himself was not moved there until 1864. In 1866, Limbangan was also separated to be its own division with an Assistant Resident.

During the early twentieth century, the residency had a number of Tea estates in its mountainous areas, as well as being a center of Tapioca flour production in the Indies. It was also one of the earliest areas in the Indies to industrialize significantly. During this time, Bandung was also the location of the first university in the Indies and the place where a number of important printing presses were located, including the popular newspaper De Preangerbode.

In 1915, Garut Regency was transferred from the Cheribon Residency to Preanger. In 1925, the four residencies of western Java were subdivided into nine new residencies. The former Preanger Regencies Residency was broken up into three smaller residencies: ,  en . However, in 1931 they were reorganized once again, with parts of the former residency now being divided between Buitzenzorg Residency and the renamed Priangan Residency. Those borders were kept by the Japanese during their occupation of Java during World War II, and for a short time by the Republic of Indonesia after 1945.

List of residents

 Gerrit Willem Casimir van Motman: 1817–1819
 Robert Lieve Jasper van der Capellen: 1819–1825
 Pieter le Clereq: 1825–1827
 Willem Nicolaas Servatius: 1827–1828
 Otto Carel Holmberg de Beckfelt: 1828–1837
 Pieter le Clereq: 1837–1839
 Johan Frans Hora Siccama: 1839–1841
 Jean Baptiste Cleerens: 1841–1846
 Pieter Johannes Overhand: 1846–1850
 Carl Philip Conrad Steinmetz: 1851–1855
 Herman Constantijn van der Wijck: 1855–1858
 Christiaan van der Moore: 1858–1874
 Ferdinand Theodoor Pahud de Mortanges: 1874–1879
 Jan Marinus van Vleuten: 1879–1884
 Albert Gustaaf George Peltzer–1884–1887
 Johannes Heijting: 1887–1891
 Johannes Diederik Harders: 1891–1894
 Christiaan Willem Kist: 1894–1900
 Eduard Thomas Theodorus Henricus van Benthem van den Bergh: 1900–1903
 Gustaaf Adolf Frederik Jan Oosthout: 1903–1907
 Willem Frederik Lamoraal Boissevain: 1907–1911
 Gideon Jan Oudemans: 1911–1913
 Tielus Jan Janssen: 1913–1917
 Louis de Stuers: 1917–1920
 Willem Pieter Hillen: 1920–1921
 August Johan Herman Eijken: 1921–1925

References

West Java
Residencies of the Dutch East Indies
1925 disestablishments in the Dutch East Indies